The 1988 Daytona 500, the 30th running of the event, was held February 14, 1988, at Daytona International Speedway in Daytona Beach, Florida, as the first race of the 1988 NASCAR Winston Cup season. Bobby Allison won his third Daytona 500 victory while Ken Schrader won the pole. It was also proven to be Bobby Allison's 84th and final Cup Series win.

This race marked the first Daytona 500 starts for Dale Jarrett, Brett Bodine, and Phil Barkdoll. It also featured the only Daytona 500 starts for Brad Teague, Steve Moore, Ed Pimm, and Rick Jeffrey. It even featured the last Daytona 500 starts for Bobby Allison, Trevor Boys, Ralph Jones, Benny Parsons, Cale Yarborough, and Connie Saylor.

Race summary
This race was best remembered for Richard Petty's rollover crash in the tri-oval on lap 106, initiated when he was tagged from behind by Phil Barkdoll. Petty's car lifted and rolled over about eight times and was then hit by Brett Bodine. The wreck also collected 1972 race winner A. J. Foyt, Eddie Bierschwale, and Alan Kulwicki. all of the drivers, including Petty, walked away. The race was also memorable for the finish, in which Bobby Allison beat his son, Davey, to the finish line. At age 50, Allison became the oldest person ever to win the Daytona 500.

Results

 12-Bobby Allison, Led 70 of 200 Laps
 28-Davey Allison, Led 9 Laps
 55-Phil Parsons, Led 2 Laps
 75-Neil Bonnett, Led 2 Laps
 11-Terry Labonte, Led 9 Laps
 25-Ken Schrader (polesitter), Led 14 Laps
 27-Rusty Wallace, Led 4 Laps
 44-Sterling Marlin, Led 13 Laps
 88-Buddy Baker
 3-Dale Earnhardt, Led 2 Laps
 17-Darrell Waltrip, Led 69 Laps
 9-Bill Elliott
 8-Bobby Hillin Jr.
 5-Geoff Bodine
 4-Rick Wilson
 1-Dale Jarrett
 26-Ricky Rudd
 21-Kyle Petty, 1 Lap down
 95-Trevor Boys, 1 Lap down
 71-Dave Marcis, 2 Laps down
 31-Brad Teague, 2 Laps down
 89-Michael Waltrip, 3 Laps down
 22-Steve Moore, 5 Laps down
 98-Ed Pimm*, 9 Laps down
 52-Jimmy Means, 9 Laps down
 92-Ralph Jones, 10 Laps down
 68-Derrike Cope, 17 Laps down
 23-Eddie Bierschwale, 19 Laps down
 33-Harry Gant, 175 Laps Completed (Accident); Led 1 Lap
 86-Rick Jeffrey*, 26 Laps down
 90-Benny Parsons, 156 Laps (Engine Failure)
 7-Alan Kulwicki, 52 Laps down
 14-A. J. Foyt, 105 Laps (Accident)
 43-Richard Petty, 104 Laps (Accident)
 15-Brett Bodine, 104 Laps (Accident)
 73-Phil Barkdoll*, 103 Laps (Accident)
 83-Lake Speed, 65 Laps (Engine Failure); Led 5 Laps
 29-Cale Yarborough, 46 Laps (Accident)
 99-Connie Saylor, 32 Laps (Accident)
 50-Greg Sacks, 22 Laps (Engine Failure)
 6-Mark Martin, 19 Laps (Overheating)
 97-Morgan Shepherd, 11 Laps (Engine Failure).

Failed to qualify
34-Donnie Allison
07-Larry Moyer
82-Mark Stahl
18-Sarel van der Merwe
85-Bobby Gerhart
2-Ernie Irvan (Rookie)
30-Michael Waltrip
67-Buddy Arrington
10-Ken Bouchard (Rookie)
24-Bobby Coyle
01-Mickey Gibbs (Rookie)
77-Ken Ragan
63-Jocko Maggiacomo
03-David Pletcher
54-Ronnie Sanders
80-Jimmy Horton
0-Delma Cowart
59-Mark Gibson
70-J.D. McDuffie
48-Tony Spanos
74-John Linville
02-Joe Booher
64-Mike Potter
39-Blackie Wangerin
56-Joey Sonntag
57-Bobby Wawak
49-Mike Porter

Notes
69 cars attempted the race.
Michael Waltrip's team bought the #89 entry owned by the Mueller Brothers after the #30 failed to qualify so that Waltrip could race.

References

Daytona 500
Daytona 500
Daytona 500
NASCAR races at Daytona International Speedway